Calvin Ray McGillivray (December 21, 1892 – April 1963) was an American football coach.  He served as the head football coach at the New River State School—now known as West Virginia University Institute of Technology—in Montgomery, West Virginia for the one season, in 1927 season, compiling a record of 0–6.

McGillivray attended high school in Utah and college in the College of Wooster in Ohio.

References

1963 deaths
1892 births
West Virginia Tech Golden Bears football coaches
College of Wooster alumni
Sportspeople from Winnipeg
Gridiron football people from Manitoba